Binuangan, officially the Municipality of Binuangan, is a 6th class municipality in the province of Misamis Oriental, Philippines. According to the 2020 census, it has a population of 7,441 people.

Geography

Barangays
Binuangan is politically subdivided into 8 barangays.
 Dampias
 Kitamban
 Kitambis
 Mabini
 Mosangot
 Nabataan
 Poblacion
 Valdeconcha

Climate

Demographics

Economy

References

External links
 [ Philippine Standard Geographic Code]
Philippine Census Information
Local Governance Performance Management System

Municipalities of Misamis Oriental